Naval Base Stadium or Armed Forces Stadium is a football stadium in Lumut, Perak, Malaysia. It is used mostly for football matches by ATM Perak. It also sometimes hosts home matches for Perak FA, whenever their home ground Perak Stadium is not available for use. The stadium holds 12,000 people and opened in 1980.

References 

Football venues in Malaysia
Athletics (track and field) venues in Malaysia
Multi-purpose stadiums in Malaysia
Buildings and structures in Perak